Anwar Miandad (born 11 March 1960) is a Pakistani former first-class cricketer who played mainly for the Habib Bank Limited cricket team. He is a younger brother of Pakistan's leading Test run scorer Javed Miandad and had two other brothers play Quaid-i-Azam Trophy matches. An all-rounder, he also took the field for Karachi and the Industrial Development Bank of Pakistan during his career.

Miandad played as a right-handed middle order batsman and bowled useful slow left-arm orthodox spin. He was a member of two Patron's Trophy final winning sides with Habib Bank Limited, the first under Javed's captaincy in 1987/88. The other was in 1991/92 when they drew with National Bank of Pakistan but were awarded the trophy because of a superior first innings, in which Miandad contributed 67 runs. He captained Habib Bank Limited twice during the 1995/96 Patron's Trophy.

Despite appearing in 141 first-class matches, Miandad only scored four centuries and never more than one in a single season. He was also run out for 99 in an innings, against Pakistan National Shipping Corporation in 1990/91.

In a Wills Cup limited-overs match for Habib Bank Limited against Lahore City at Peshawar in the 1988/89 season, Miandad had record bowling figures with 7 for 20. His bowling record at the time was the best ever in Pakistani domestic limited-overs cricket.

A reliable fielder, Miandad won the 'Fielder of the Tournament' award in the 1982/83 Wills Cup.

References

External links

1960 births
Living people
Pakistani cricketers
Habib Bank Limited cricketers
Cricketers from Karachi
Karachi A cricketers
Industrial Development Bank of Pakistan cricketers
Karachi Whites cricketers
Karachi cricketers
Pakistani people of Gujarati descent